The territory of Saint Barthélemy consists of Saint Barthelemy and the near islands.

Champions per year
2003/04: FC Gustavia
2004/05: FC Beach-Hôtel
2005/06: FC Beach-Hôtel
2006/07: FC Amicale (ex FC Beach-Hôtel)
2007/08: ASPSB (Association Sportive Portugaise de Saint Barthélémy)
2008/09: ASPSB
2009/10: ASPSB
2010/11: ASPSB
2011/12: FC Amicale (ex FC Beach-Hôtel)
2012/13: Ouanalao FC
2013/14: Ouanalao FC
2014/15: AS Gustavia
2015/16: AS Gustavia
2016/17: ASPSB
2017/18: FC Arawak
2018/19: ASPSB
2020: Cancelled
2021: Team FWI
2022: Team FWI

See also
Saint-Martin Championships

References

RSSSF

Saint Barthélemy football competitions